Main City Park is a  public park in Gresham, Oregon.

Features
By 2014, the park had an off-leash dog area and surveillance cameras. Main City Park also has a baseball field.

Gresham Japanese Garden on Tsuru Island 
Main City Park houses the volunteer-led Gresham Japanese Garden on Tsuru Island.

Heroes Memorial 
The Heroes Memorial is installed in the park's northwest corner.

Ebetsu Plaza
Ebetsu Plaza is a public plaza between the Springwater Corridor and the Gresham Japanese Garden on Tsuru Island. Completed in 2018, the plaza commemorates the sister city relationship between Gresham and Ebetsu, Japan.

References

External links

 Main City Park at the City of Gresham, Oregon
 Ebetsu Plaza at Friends of Gresham Japanese Garden

Gresham, Oregon
Municipal parks in Oregon